Hedong Subdistrict is a subdistrict of Yingdong District, Fuyang, Anhui, China.

Township-level divisions of Anhui
Fuyang